Hancock County is a county in the U.S. state of Iowa. As of the 2020 census, the population was 10,795. The county seat is Garner. The county was founded on January 15, 1851, and named in honor of John Hancock, a leader of the Continental Congress during the American Revolution.

Geography

Major highways
 U.S. Highway 18
 U.S. Highway 69
 Iowa Highway 17

Adjacent counties
Winnebago County  (north)
Cerro Gordo County  (east)
Wright County  (south)
Kossuth County  (west)

History
Hancock county was established as a result of an election on June 28, 1858.  At the time two townships, Avery and Madison,  were also established.  Soon after a courthouse was built in Garner, Iowa that continues to be the county seat.

Demographics

2020 census
There were 5,113 housing units, of which 4,585 were occupied.

2010 census
There were 5,330 housing units, of which 4,741 were occupied.

2000 census

At the 2000 census there were 12,100 people, 4,795 households, and 3,375 families in the county.  The population density was 21 people per square mile (8/km2).  There were 5,164 housing units at an average density of 9 per square mile (3/km2).  The racial makeup of the county was 97.70% White, 0.09% Black or African American, 0.10% Native American, 0.31% Asian, 0.02% Pacific Islander, 1.38% from other races, and 0.40% from two or more races.  2.49%. were Hispanic or Latino of any race.

Of the 4,795 households 32.60% had children under the age of 18 living with them, 60.90% were married couples living together, 6.00% had a female householder with no husband present, and 29.60% were non-families. 26.50% of households were one person and 13.70% were one person aged 65 or older.  The average household size was 2.48 and the average family size was 3.01.

The age distribution was 26.50% under the age of 18, 6.60% from 18 to 24, 25.50% from 25 to 44, 23.50% from 45 to 64, and 17.90% 65 or older.  The median age was 40 years. For every 100 females there were 96.80 males.  For every 100 females age 18 and over, there were 95.00 males.

The median household income was $37,703 and the median family income was $44,248. Males had a median income of $29,452 versus $20,376 for females. The per capita income for the county was $17,957.  About 5.20% of families and 6.00% of the population were below the poverty line, including 6.90% of those under age 18 and 6.90% of those age 65 or over.

Economy

As of December 2008, the unemployment rate in Hancock County was 9.1%, a sharp rise from 4.0% in December 2007.  In 2016 the unemployment rate dropped back to 2.2%.

Communities

Cities

Britt
Corwith
Crystal Lake
Forest City (part)
Garner
Goodell
Kanawha
Klemme
Woden

Census-designated places
 Duncan
 Hayfield
 Hutchins
 Miller

Other unincorporated community
 Stilson

Townships
Hancock County is divided into sixteen townships:

 Amsterdam
 Avery
 Bingham
 Boone
 Britt
 Concord
 Crystal
 Ell
 Ellington
 Erin
 Garfield
 Liberty
 Madison
 Magor
 Orthel
 Twin Lake

Population ranking
The population ranking of the following table is based on the 2020 census of Hancock County.
† county seat

Politics

See also

Hancock County Courthouse
National Register of Historic Places listings in Hancock County, Iowa

References

External links

Hancock County, Iowa Official website

 
1851 establishments in Iowa
Populated places established in 1851